The Breweries & Bottleyards Employees Industrial Union of Workers WA (BBEIUW (WA)) is a trade union in Australia. It is affiliated with the Australian Council of Trade Unions.

External links
 BBEIUW (WA) at the ACTU.

Trade unions in Western Australia
Food processing trade unions